In geology, a palaeochannel, palaeovalley, or palaeoriver (US spellings paleo-) is the remnant of an inactive river or stream channel that has been filled or buried by younger sediment. The sediments that the ancient channel is cut into or buried by can be unconsolidated, semi-consolidated, consolidated or lithified. The word palaeochannel is formed from palaeo 'old' and channel.

Recognition 
A palaeochannel is distinct from the overbank deposits of currently-active river channels, including ephemeral water courses that do not regularly flow (such as the Todd River, Central Australia) because the river bed is filled with sedimentary deposits unrelated to the normal bed load of the current drainage pattern.

Many palaeochannels are arranged on old drainage patterns, distinct from the current drainage system of a catchment. For example, palaeochannels may relate to a system of rivers and creeks that drained east–west while the current drainage direction is north–south.

Palaeochannels can be most easily identified as broad erosional channels into a basement that underlies a system of depositional sequences, which may contain several episodes of deposition and represent meandering peneplain streams.

Thereafter, a palaeochannel may form part of the regolith of a region and although it is unconsolidated or partly consolidated, it is currently part of the erosional surface.

Palaeochannels can also be identified according to their age. For example, there are deposits of Tertiary lignites in the Tertiary river systems preserved on top of Archaean basement in the Yilgarn Craton of Western Australia. The river systems have laid in place for 15 to 50 million years and would be considered palaeochannels.

Palaeochannels can be identified using airborne electromagnetic surveys, as the coarse-grained sediments are more electrically resistive than surrounding materials.

Formation 
Paleochannels form when river channels aggrade and so deposit sediment on their bed. For the channel deposits to be preserved, the flow must not occupy and erode them again. Examples of what may cause long-term preservation include the channels being in a net-depositional environment and/or being in a subsiding sedimentary basin. Paleochannels may also be preserved in the short-term on non-net-depositional floodplains in which the river migrates or avulses away from its previous course. The preservation is short-term because unless the channel deposits are buried, flow will eventually reoccupy its formerly-occupied course, reworking and eroding the channel deposits.

Geological importance 
Palaeochannels are important to geology for a number of reasons:
 Understanding movements of faults, which may redirect river systems and so form stranded channels that are, in essence, palaeochannels.
 Preserving Tertiary, Eocene and Holocene sediments and fossils within them, important locations for palaeontology, palaeobotany and archaeology. 
 Preserving evidence of older erosional surfaces and levels, which is useful for estimating the net erosional budget of older regolith.
 Preserving sedimentary records, which is useful for understanding climatic conditions, including various isotopic indicators of past rainfall, temperatures and climates, used to understand climate change and global warming.

Examples

There is a large palaeovalley underneath Anangu Pitjantjatjara Yankunytjatjara (APY lands) in the remote north-west of South Australia.

Economic importance 
Palaeochannels can host economic ore deposits of uranium, lignite, precious metals such as gold and platinum, heavy minerals such as tin, tungsten, and iron ore preserved as paleo-placer deposits.

Palaeochannels have been proposed as a mechanism for managed aquifer recharge in California.

See also 
 Sedimentology
 Erosion
 Ore genesis
 Paleoshoreline
 Placer mining
 Uranium ore deposits

References 

Sedimentary structures